Big Bag is a live action television puppet program that aired from 1996 to 1998.

Big Bag may also refer to:

Flexible intermediate bulk container
Big Bag Records, distributor of Genom vatten och eld etc.
Big Bag trap, see Battle of Pszczyna

See also
Big Bags, album by Milt Jackson
BigAirBAG, Dutch enterprise developing cushion
Big Brown Bag